Tingnes is a village in Ringsaker Municipality in Innlandet county, Norway. The village is located on the southern end of the Nes peninsula, along the shores of the lake Mjøsa. There is a bridge from Tingnes to the island of Helgøya to the south. Nes Church is located in the village.

Tingnes was the administrative centre of the old municipality of Nes which existed from 1838 until 1964.

References

Ringsaker
Villages in Innlandet